The Cave of Reveillon (French: Gouffre de Réveillon) is a French cave located near Alvignac, Lot department.

References

Caves of Lot (department)